Notre-Dame-du-Rosaire is a municipality of about 400 people in Montmagny Regional County Municipality within the Chaudière-Appalaches region of Quebec. It is located on the south shore of the Saint Lawrence River, 20 km south of Montmagny on Route 283.

See also
 List of municipalities in Quebec

References

Municipalities in Quebec
Incorporated places in Chaudière-Appalaches